Bullet Union were a punk band based in Camden Town, London. Their sound was influenced by Drive Like Jehu, Sonic Youth and Unwound.

History
The band formed in late 2002 by ex-members of the hardcore bands Dead Inside and Ursa and current members of Comet Gain and Shoe!. They released one studio album, Ruin's Domino, and one single "Stay Indie, Don't Be a Hater". John Peel played the band several times. Bullet Union toured the UK in 2004 with Q and Not U and Europe with The Blood Brothers in 2005. They disbanded in April 2006 after completing a headline tour of Europe.

Releases

Single

2003
"Stay Indie, Don't Be a Hater / 'Robin...I'll Be Back in Five Minutes" - 7" single on Jealous Records.  Two pressings - 500 white vinyl / 500 pink vinyl

Studio Album

2004
Ruins Domino - CD / LP - on Jealous Records.  The LP version features a bonus track, a cover of "He's Waiting" by The Sonics. Original artwork for the album was drawn by the 'Biff' cartoonist Chris Garratt.

Line Up

Jodie William Cox - Vocals / Guitar
Kaoru Ishikawa - Bass
Paul Jonathan Symes - Guitar
Robin Silas Christian - Drums

References

External links
Bullet Union website
Bullet Union MySpace
Jealous Records website
"Set fire to 05" - Drowned In Sound interview 

Musical groups established in 2002
2002 establishments in England